Satoumi (里海) is defined as marine and coastal landscapes that have been formed and maintained by prolonged interaction between humans and ecosystems.

See also
 Satoyama, management of forests through local agricultural communities

References

Nature conservation in Japan
Japanese words and phrases